Promyslovka is a rural locality (a selo) and the administrative center of Promyslovsky Selsoviet, Limansky District, Astrakhan Oblast, Russia. The population was 1,453 as of 2010. There are 10 streets.

Geography 
Promyslovka is located 8 km southwest of Liman (the district's administrative centre) by road. Yandyki is the nearest rural locality.

References 

Rural localities in Limansky District